Philippe Mario Aghion FBA (born 17 August 1956) is a French economist who is a professor at College de France, at INSEAD, and at the London School of Economics. He is also teaching at the Paris School of Economics. Philippe Aghion was formerly the Robert C. Waggoner Professor of Economics at Harvard University. Prior to that, he was a professor at University College London, an Official Fellow at Nuffield College, Oxford, and an Assistant Professor at the Massachusetts Institute of Technology (MIT).

Early life and education
Philippe Aghion was born in Paris, the son of Gaby and Raymond Aghion.<ref>Aghion, Philippe et Banerjee, Abhijit Volatility And Growth. Oxford University Press, 2005 (See dedication: « To our parents Gaby and Raymond Aghion... »).</ref>

Aghion graduated from the mathematics section of the École Normale Supérieure de Cachan and obtained a Diplôme d'études approfondies (DEA) in mathematical economics from University of Paris 1 Pantheon-Sorbonne. He received his PhD in economics from Harvard University in 1987.

Career
His main research work is on growth and innovation. With Peter Howitt, he developed the "Schumpeterian paradigm", and extended the paradigm in several directions; much of the resulting work is summarized in his joint book with Howitt titled Endogenous Growth Theory, and more recently in The Power of Creative Destruction. In 2019 he received the BBVA Foundation Frontiers of Knowledge Award in Economics.

He is a member of the American Academy of Arts and Science, and was elected as a Corresponding Fellow of the British Academy in 2015. He was the President of the European Economic Association in 2017. He has been an editor of the Annual Review of Economics since 2018.

Other activities
Aghion was elected a Fellow of the American Academy of Arts and Sciences in 2009 and he is a member of the Executive and Supervisory Committee (ESC) of CERGE-EI. He also serves on the Scientific Advisory Board of the Max Planck Institute for Research on Collective Goods.

Ahead of the 2012 French presidential election, Aghion co-signed an appeal of several economists in support of candidate François Hollande.

In 2016, Aghion was appointed by United Nations Secretary-General Ban Ki-Moon to an expert group advising the High-Level Commission on Health Employment and Economic Growth, which was co-chaired by presidents François Hollande of France and Jacob Zuma of South Africa. In 2021, he was appointed to the World Bank–International Monetary Fund High-Level Advisory Group (HLAG) on Sustainable and Inclusive Recovery and Growth, co-chaired by Mari Pangestu, Ceyla Pazarbasioglu, and Nicholas Stern.

Publications

 Aghion, Philippe; Antonin, Celine; Bunel, Simon (2021): The Power of Creative Destruction: Economic Upheaval and the Wealth of Nations. Harvard University Press. .
 Aghion, Philippe; Howitt, Peter (2009); The Economics of Growth. MIT Press. 
 Aghion, Philippe; Griffith, Rachel (2006). Competition and Growth. MIT Press. 
 Aghion, Philippe; Durlauf, Steven N. (2005). Handbook of economic growth. 1A. Amsterdam: Elsevier. .
 Aghion, Philippe; Durlauf, Steven N. (2005). Handbook of economic growth. 1B. Amsterdam: Elsevier. .
 Aghion, Philippe; Howitt, Peter (1998). Endogenous growth theory''. Cambridge, Massachusetts: MIT Press. .

References

External links
 INSEAD biography page
 CV
 
 The Economics of Creative Destruction, a festschrift symposium in honour of Philippe Aghion and Peter Howitt, organised by Ufuk Agcigit and John Van Reenen, June 9–12, 2021
 Opening and tribute to Emmanuel Farhi
 Introduction
 Creative destruction and the labour market
 Competition and creative destruction
 Trade and innovation
 Growth measurement and growth decline
 Political economy of creative destruction
 Growth and the environment
 Growth meets development
 Inequality and creative destruction
 Taxation, regulation and innovation
 Finance, firm dynamics and growth
 Organisation of innovation
 Science and innovation
 Innovation and growth policy
 Address by President Emmanuel Macron
 Concluding remarks

Harvard University faculty
Massachusetts Institute of Technology faculty
Academics of University College London
Fellows of Nuffield College, Oxford
Fellows of the American Academy of Arts and Sciences
Harvard University alumni
University of Paris alumni
1956 births
20th-century French Jews
Living people
20th-century  French economists
21st-century French economists
Fellows of the Econometric Society
Corresponding Fellows of the British Academy
Annual Reviews (publisher) editors